Petr Tenkrát (born 31 May 1977) is a Czech former ice hockey forward who played in the National Hockey League for the Mighty Ducks of Anaheim, Nashville Predators and the Boston Bruins.

Playing career 
He won SM-Liiga-silver in 2003 and bronze in 2006. SM-gold in 2004 and 2005.

Tenkrát's contract with Kärpät ended after the season 2005–06. He started the 2006–07 season with Boston Bruins's AHL affiliate, the Providence Bruins, after a trade with the Toronto Maple Leafs. He had signed a one-year deal with the club. On November 11, 2006 Tenkrát was called up from the Providence team to take the place of Boston forward Jeff Hoggan, and scored his first goal for the Bruins, wearing player number 17, in a home game against the Ottawa Senators that same night.

In both the 2007–08 and 2008–09 seasons Tenkrát returned to his hometown team before moving to Sweden's Elitserien to play with Timrå IK. He then signed a two-year contract with Skellefteå AIK. He then returned to Czech Republic, signing with HC Sparta Praha for 2011-12 season.

He also was a member of the Czech national inline hockey team at the 2008 Men's World Inline Hockey Championships in Bratislava, Slovakia.

Career statistics

References

External links

1977 births
Living people
Boston Bruins players
Cincinnati Mighty Ducks players
Czech ice hockey right wingers
Czech expatriate ice hockey players in Russia
HC Khimik Voskresensk players
Rytíři Kladno players
HPK players
Ilves players
Anaheim Ducks draft picks
Mighty Ducks of Anaheim players
Milwaukee Admirals players
Nashville Predators players
Oulun Kärpät players
Sportspeople from Kladno
Providence Bruins players
Skellefteå AIK players
Timrå IK players
Czech expatriate ice hockey players in Finland
Czech expatriate ice hockey players in the United States
Czech expatriate ice hockey players in Sweden